Okiddo was a weekly educational show of ABS-CBN TV-4 Davao hosted by James Infiesto, Laica Teh & Mac-mac Dalagan. This show, which aired every Saturday mornings, used Filipino (2005-2006) and Cebuano (2006-2008) languages.

Segments
Gusto Kong Maging... artista
Kiddie Art acting hosting
at iba pa

Previous hosts
James Infiesto
Anton Kintanar
Kata Shotwell
Thristan Joshua "TeeJay" Braga Corsino

Television in Davao City
ABS-CBN Regional shows
2005 Philippine television series debuts
2008 Philippine television series endings